The Solar Decathlon AFRICA is an international competition that challenges collegiate teams to design and build houses powered exclusively by the sun. The winner of the competition is the team that is able to score the most points in ten contests.

On November 15, 2016, the Moroccan Ministry of Energy, Mines, Water, and Sustainable development; the Moroccan Research Institute in Solar Energy and New Energies (IRESEN); and the United States Department of Energy signed a memorandum of understanding to collaborate on the development of Solar Decathlon Africa, a competition that will integrate unique local and regional characteristics while following the philosophy, principles, and model of the U.S. Department of Energy Solar Decathlon. The competition is planned for September 2019.

This competition takes place during even years, alternating with the U.S.-based competition, Solar Decathlon by agreement between the United States and Moroccan governments.

Solar Decathlon Africa 2019 

The 2019 edition of the Solar Decathlon Africa will take place in Ben Guerir, Morocco

Participants:

Contests 

 Architecture
 Engineering and Construction
 Market Appeal
 Comfort Conditions
 Appliances
 Sustainability
 Home life and entertainment
 Communication and Social Awareness
 Electrical Energy and Balance
 Innovation

See also

 Solar Decathlon
 Solar Decathlon China
 Solar Decathlon Europe
 Solar Decathlon Middle East
 Solar Decathlon Latin America and Caribbean

References

External links
 Solar Decathlon Africa Main Website
 U.S. Department of Energy Solar Decathlon
 Solar Decathlon Europe 2019
 Solar Decathlon Europe 2014
 Solar Decathlon Latin America and Caribbean
 Solar Decathlon Middle East
 Solar Decathlon China

Sustainable building
Building engineering
Sustainable architecture
Low-energy building
Energy conservation
Sustainable building in Africa
Solar Decathlon